The  Mihrimah Sultan Mosque (Turkish: Mihrimah Sultan Cami) is a 16th-century Ottoman mosque located near the Byzantine land walls in the Edirnekapı neighborhood of Istanbul, Turkey. It was commissioned by Mihrimah Sultan, the daughter of Suleiman the Magnificent, and designed by the chief imperial architect Mimar Sinan. Sited on the summit of the Sixth Hill near the highest point of the city, the mosque is a prominent city landmark.

History
The Mihrimah Sultan Mosque in Edirnekapı is the second and larger of two mosques named and commissioned by Mihrimah Sultan, the much loved only daughter of Suleiman the Magnificent. It was designed by Mimar Sinan and although there is no foundation inscription the evidence from surviving manuscripts suggests that building work started in 1563 and was completed by 1570. 

On several occasions the mosque has been damaged by earthquakes. In 1719 some of the stairs in the minaret were destroyed; in 1766, an earthquake caused the collapse of the minaret and the main dome of the mosque; in the severe 1894 earthquake the minaret came crashing down on the north west corner of the mosque. Although efforts were made to restore the mosque itself, its attendant buildings received less attention. The mosque was restored in 1956-57 but the dome was damaged again during the 1999 İzmit earthquake. 

In the first phase of the most recent restoration undertaken between 2007 and 2010 the mosque and the upper part of the minaret were repaired. The second phase involved paving the courtyard, restoring the central fountain and rebuilding an outer portico (the mosque originally had a double portico but only the inner part had survived).

Architecture

Exterior
The mosque was built on a terrace overlooking the main street. A portico divided into individual cells forming a medrese (Islamic school) surrounds the mosque's large courtyard. In the center of the courtyard is a large ablutions fountain (sadirvan). Entry to the mosque is through an imposing porch of seven domed bays with marble and granite columns. The mosque itself is a cube topped by a half-sphere, with symmetrical multi-windowed tympana on each of the four sides. The dome is supported by four towers, one in each corner; its base is pierced by windows. The single minaret is tall and slender; during the 1894 earthquake it crashed through the roof of the mosque. It has since been fully restored.

Interior

On the north and south sides, triple arcades supported by granite columns open onto side aisles with galleries above, each with three domed bays. Much of the surface area of the walls is made up of windows, making the mosque one of the lightest of any of Sinan's works. Some of the windows contain stained glass.

The interior stencil decorations are all modern. However, the mimbar in carved white marble is from the original construction.

Complex
As first built, the Mihrimah Sultan Mosque was the centre of a complex (külliye) which included a medrese, a double hamam, a tomb (türbe) and a row of shops (arasta) beneath the terrace, whose rents provided financial support for the complex. The hamam is still in use today. 

Mihrimah Sultana herself is buried at the Süleymaniye Mosque, but a ruined türbe behind this mosque houses the graves of her son-in-law, the Grand Vizier Semiz Ali Pasha, her daughter Ayşe Hümaşah Sultan, her grandsons Mehmed Bey, Şehid Mustafa Pasha and Osman Bey and many other members of her family.

Gallery

See also
List of Friday mosques designed by Mimar Sinan

Notes

References

Sources

Further reading

External links
 Mihrimah Sultan Complex at Edirnekapi, Archnet.
Photographs of the Mihrimah Sultan Mosque in Edirnekapı by Dick Osseman

Mosque buildings with domes
Religious buildings and structures completed in 1565
Mimar Sinan buildings
Ottoman mosques in Istanbul
Fatih
16th-century mosques
1565 establishments in the Ottoman Empire
Sunni mosques in Turkey